Timea Bacsinszky and Kristina Barrois were the defending champions having won the last edition in 2013, but chose not to participate.

Irina Maria Bara and Alona Fomina won the title, defeating Guadalupe Pérez Rojas and Jil Teichmann in the final, 6–2, 6–1.

Seeds

Draw

References 
 Draw

Soho Square Ladies Tournament - Doubles